Giovanni Consolini (1818–1906) was an Italian composer. His opera Il conte di Salto successfully premiered at the Teatro Chiabrera in Savona on 21 January 1894. He was also known for his opera La finta pazza.

Sources
University of Toronto Libraries, Catalog entry:Ser Gregorio; melodramma giocoso in due atti. Espressamente scritta pel Teatro Re, il carnevale 1847-48

External links
List of works Giovanni Consolini held in the Biblioteca Nazionale Braidense.
Consolini, Giovanni 1818-1906 on WorldCat

1818 births
1906 deaths
Italian classical composers
Italian male classical composers
Italian opera composers
Male opera composers
19th-century Italian musicians
19th-century Italian male musicians